This is a list of cricketers who played for Norfolk cricket teams in first-class cricket matches. Norfolk teams played six matches which have been classified as first-class cricket during the early 19th century. A total of 32 men played in the six matches for Norfolk, with three, the Pilch brothers, playing in all six.

The first match in which a Norfolk team took place which is considered first-class took place against MCC at Lord's in 1820. It is generally accepted that the match was actually organised by Holt Cricket Club with three guest players - E. H. Budd, Felix Ladbroke and Thomas Vigne - added to the side. This was one of only five matches which took place in 1820 to have been retrospectively given first-class status. William Ward, playing for MCC, scored 278 runs in the first innings of the match, batting over three days. This score has generally been considered to be the first double-century scored in first-class cricket. Ward's score was not beaten in a first-class game until WG Grace scored 344 runs in an innings in 1876.

The remaining five matches were played between 1833 and 1836, after the formation of the original Norfolk County Club in 1826 or 1827. All five were against Yorkshire sides, essentially teams organised by Sheffield Cricket Club. One match took place in 1833 at Hyde Park, Sheffield, with two being played in both 1834 and 1836, on both occasions with one match was played at Sheffield and one at the New Ground in Norwich. Norfolk regularly played matches against other teams with first-class status throughout the 1830s and 1840s, including MCC and the Cambridge Town Club, but none of these matches have been awarded first-class status. The County Club had largely ceased to operate by 1848, although matches continued to be played using the name Norfolk.

The current Norfolk County Cricket Club was established in 1877. The club has played Minor Counties Championship cricket since 1895 and played 26 List A cricket matches between 1965 and 2003. Players who played in these matches are listed separately.

B

D

E

F

G

H

K

L

M

P

Q

R

S

V

W

Notes

Sources

Bibliography
 Birley D (1999) A Social History of English Cricket. London: Aurum. 
 Carlaw D (2020) Kent County Cricketers A to Z. Part One: 1806–1914 (revised edition). (Available online at the Association of Cricket Statisticians and Historians. Retrieved 2020-12-21.)
 Hounsome, K (2015) A Game Well Played - a History of Cricket in Norfolk. Norwich: Hounsome.

References

Norfolk
Norfolk first-class cricketers